Annasaheb may refer to:

Ganpatrao Annasaheb Deshmukh (1927–2021), Indian politician
Annasaheb Jolle (born 1963), Indian politician and Member of Parliament
Shashikala Annasaheb Jolle (born 1969), Indian social worker and politician
Annasaheb Kirloskar (1843–1885), Marathi playwright from Maharashtra, India
Annasaheb Magar, the former MP of 6th Lok Sabha
Annasaheb M. K. Patil (born 1939), Indian politician and member of parliament
Annasaheb Sahasrabuddhe, Indian independence activist, Gandhian, social worker
Annasaheb Shinde (1922–1993), member of 3rd and 4th Lok Sabha from Kopargaon

See also
Annasaheb Dange College of Engineering & Technology, Ashta, Maharashtra
Annasaheb Awate Arts, Commerce & Hutatma Babu Genu Science College, Maharashtra
Annasaheb Chudaman Patil Memorial Medical College, Maharashtra
Annasaheb Magar PCMC Stadium, multi purposed stadium in the city of Pune, India